Bořetín may refer to several places in the Czech Republic:
 Bořetín (Jindřichův Hradec District), village in Jindřichův Hradec District
 Bořetín (Pelhřimov District), village in  Pelhřimov District